China Resources Tower, colloquially known as the Spring Bamboo, is a  supertall skyscraper in Houhai, Nanshan, Shenzhen, Guangdong. Construction started in 2012 and the building topped out on July 1, 2016. It surpassed Shun Hing Square as the 3rd tallest building in Shenzhen upon its completion in 2018. It is owned by China Resources, which has its headquarters there.

At the foot of the building is the shopping mall named "Shenzhen Bay MixC", together with basement carparks. Subways connects the shopping mall with Shenzhen Bay Sports Centre and Shenzhen Metro Line 11 Houhai Station.

Gallery

See also

One Shenzhen Bay
Andaz Shenzhen Bay
List of tallest buildings in Shenzhen
List of tallest buildings in China
List of tallest buildings in the world

References

Skyscraper office buildings in Shenzhen
Skyscrapers in Shenzhen